Lane's Mill was a gristmill, sawmill and fulling mill on Four Mile Creek in Section 31 of Milford Township, Butler County, Ohio.

The abandoned mill is on Lanes Mill Road, north of Wallace Road.  It is within two miles of the present corporate limit of Oxford, Ohio.

History
The original mill was built about 1816 by Isiah Bryant and John Wallace, who also operated the mill for several years. It was rebuilt in 1850 by William Elliott (or Elliot) as a three-story mill, and its owners included James Smiley and later his son-in-law, William L. Lane of Oxford, whose name remains attached to the mill and the road.

The Lane's Mill Historic Buildings, 3884 Wallace Road, were added to the National Register of Historic Places in 1980. The Manrod family owned and operated the farm complex after the 1880s.

References

Grinding mills in Ohio
Historic districts in Butler County, Ohio
National Register of Historic Places in Butler County, Ohio
Grinding mills on the National Register of Historic Places in Ohio
Historic districts on the National Register of Historic Places in Ohio